The Return of the Frog is a 1938 British crime film directed by Maurice Elvey and starring Gordon Harker, Hartley Power and Rene Ray. It is a sequel to the 1937 film The Frog, and was based on the 1929 novel The India-Rubber Men by Edgar Wallace. It was shot at Beaconsfield Studios. The film's plot concerns a police hunt for the criminal known as The Frog.

Cast
 Gordon Harker as Inspector Elk
 Hartley Power as 'Chicago Dale' Sandford
 Rene Ray as Lela Oaks
 Cyril Smith as Maggs
 Charles Lefeaux as Golly Oaks
 Una O'Connor as Mum Oaks
 Meinhart Maur as 'Dutchy' Alkmann
 George Hayes as Dandy Lane
 Charles Carson as Chief Commissioner
 Aubrey Mallalieu as Banker
 Alexander Field as Sniffy Offer  
 Philip Godfrey as Number 39  
 Patrick Holt as Cadet with Question  
 David Keir as Number 23  
 Norman Pierce as Policeman  
 George Street as Waiter  
 Charles Victor as Customer in Night Club

Critical reception
Fantastic Movie Musings and Ramblings wrote "On the plus side, this movie is well-acted, is full of amusing one-liners, and features Una O’Connor. On the minus side, the plot is confusing and it feels alternately rushed and dull. I get the feeling they were trying to shoehorn too much story into its 73 minute running time, and as a result, it feels cramped and doesn’t flow well"; while TV Guide noted "an enjoyable mix of comedy and drama," and singled out Gordon Harker as "likable in a role he had filled before in the movies and on stage."

References

Bibliography
 Low, Rachael. Filmmaking in 1930s Britain. George Allen & Unwin, 1985.
 Wood, Linda. British Films, 1927-1939. British Film Institute, 1986.

External links
 

1938 films
1938 crime films
1930s English-language films
Films based on works by Edgar Wallace
Films directed by Maurice Elvey
Films produced by Herbert Smith (producer)
Films set in England
Films shot at Beaconsfield Studios
British crime films
Films set in London
British black-and-white films
1930s British films